Jayani Tissera Dissanayake was the 3rd Chief Minister of North Central Province. She was appointed on 15 April 1999 succeeding Jayasena Dissanayake and was Chief Minister until June 1999. She was succeeded by her husband Berty Premalal Dissanayake.

Dissanayake is a trained teacher of Mathematics. Her husband is Berty Premalal Dissanayake whom she has 4 Sons with, including Duminda Dissanayake.

References

Chief Ministers of North Central Province, Sri Lanka